Luchs (German for Lynx) may refer to:

Military
 Luchs (tank), a light reconnaissance model of the Panzer II World War II German tank
 Spähpanzer Luchs, a German amphibious reconnaissance vehicle in service from 1975 to 2009
 , an Imperial German gunboat commissioned in 1900
 German torpedo boat Luchs, commissioned in 1929

Other uses
 Jürg Luchs (born 1956), Swiss cyclist
Luchs, a character from Saber Marionette J

See also
Luch (disambiguation)
Lux (disambiguation)

Surnames from nicknames